"The Thin Wall" is Ultravox's first single from the Rage in Eden album, recorded in Conny Plank’s Studio in Cologne, Germany and released on Chrysalis Records on 14 August 1981.

The music video, directed by Russell Mulcahy, features Midge Ure struggling to cope among strange and nightmarish imagery, similar to a haunted house setting, while the other band members seemingly plot his demise.

It peaked at #14 in the UK Single Charts.

There is no extended version of "The Thin Wall" unlike other Ultravox singles; the A-side on the 12" is identical to the album version, while the 7" version is an edit.

Track listings

7" vinyl

12" vinyl

Chart performance

References

Ultravox songs
1981 singles
Songs written by Midge Ure
Songs written by Warren Cann
Songs written by Billy Currie
Songs written by Chris Cross
Music videos directed by Russell Mulcahy
1981 songs
Chrysalis Records singles